Kakar District,, also Khak-e Afghan is a district of Zabul province in southern Afghanistan. It has a population of about 23,400 as of 2013.

See also 

 Districts of Afghanistan

References

External links 

Districts of Zabul Province